The Jerusalem International Book Forum (JIBF), previously known as the Jerusalem International Book Fair, is a business fair and literary festival co-founded by Asher Weill in 1963.  It takes place in Jerusalem every second year, and hosts the awarding of the Jerusalem Prize.

Location
The Fair was annually held in Jerusalem's International Convention Center (Binyanei Hauma) from 1963 until 2015. Since 2015 it is spread across a number of cultural institutions supported by the Jerusalem Foundation, such as Mishkenot Sha'ananim, the Jerusalem Cinematheque and Khan Theatre.

In 2019, the name of the event was changed from the Jerusalem International Book Fair to the Jerusalem International Book Forum.

Awards
The JIBF hosts the award of the Jerusalem Prize to a writer whose work best expresses and promotes the idea of the freedom of the individual in society. The Jerusalem Prize has in fact been awarded to five writers who afterwards received the Nobel Prize for literature. It was awarded to the American playwright Arthur Miller in 2003  and to the British writer Ian McEwan in 2011.

References

External links 
 

Literary festivals in Israel
Festivals in Jerusalem
Recurring events established in 1963
1963 establishments in Israel
Book fairs in Israel
Winter events in Israel
Biennial events